Andrey Volgin (born 22 December 1981) is a Russian film director, producer, editor and cinematographer.

Biography 
Andrey studied at the Faculty of Film and Television Direction at the University of Natalia Nesterova. In 1998 he began work in advertising and he took part in the production of more than 50 videos.

Filmography

As director
 Tonight the Angels Cried (2008)
 Spiral (2014)
 Run! (2016)
 Dance to Death (2017)
 Seryozhka (2018)
 The Balkan Line (2019)

As cinematographer
 Hope (2002)

As editor
 Seryozhka (2018)

As producer
 Seryozhka (2018)

References

External links

Living people
Russian film directors
1981 births